Linda May Bartoshuk (born 1938) is an American psychologist. She is a Presidential Endowed Professor of Community Dentistry and Behavioral Science at the University of Florida.  She is an internationally known researcher specializing in the chemical senses of taste and smell, having discovered that some people are supertasters.

Biography
Bartoshuk grew up in Aberdeen, South Dakota. She received her B.A. from Carleton College and her PhD from Brown University.

Her research explores the genetic variations in taste perception and how taste perception affects overall health. Bartoshuk was the first to discover that burning mouth syndrome, a condition predominantly experienced by postmenopausal women, is caused by damage to the taste buds at the front of the tongue and is not a psychosomatic condition. She was employed at Yale University prior to accepting a position at the University of Florida in 2005. Bartoshuk's work at Yale was funded through a series of NIH grants.

She was elected a Fellow of the American Academy of Arts and Sciences in 1995. In 2003, she was elected to the National Academy of Sciences.

Selected works
 
Bartoshuk, Linda M, Dreyer, E., Klee, H.J., Odabasi, A.Z., Sims, C.A., Snyder, D.J., & Tieman, D.M. (2014). Mutant tomato varieties and the study of volatile-enhanced-sweetness. Paper presented at the Association for Chemoreception Sciences, 2014.
Bartoshuk, L.M., Marino, S., Snyder, D.J., & Stamps, J. (2013, in press). Head trauma, taste damage and weight gain. Chemical Senses.

References

External links
National Academy of Sciences audio interview
Coverage of Bartoshuk's research

American women psychologists
21st-century American psychologists
Brown University alumni
Carleton College alumni
Fellows of the American Academy of Arts and Sciences
Members of the United States National Academy of Sciences
People from Aberdeen, South Dakota
University of Florida faculty
Yale University faculty
1938 births
Living people
American women academics
21st-century American women
20th-century American psychologists